Melanie Bracewell is a New Zealand comedian, actress and scriptwriter. In 2018, Bracewell won New Zealand's Billy T Award.

Life and career 
Bracewell grew up in Beach Haven in Auckland's North Shore, and is a niece of Test cricketers John Bracewell and Brendon Bracewell. Bracewell attended Birkenhead College, serving as Deputy Head Girl, then studied Communication and Media Studies at the University of Auckland. Bracewell became interested in comedy as a child and, as a teenager, wrote a comedic blog, later moving into stand-up comedy. Bracewell also worked as producer of the breakfast show on Radio Hauraki and appeared as a contestant on the Australian TV quiz show Have You Been Paying Attention?. She co-hosts the Australian comedy television show The Cheap Seats alongside Tim McDonald.

In 2019, Bracewell began writing for the TV show The Project in New Zealand. She has also written for the series Wellington Paranormal.

In 2020, Bracewell received international coverage when videos and photos of her impersonating Prime Minister Jacinda Ardern went viral. Ardern responded with: "You do my makeup better than I do." Bracewell and Ardern later met and posted a TikTok video while Bracewell was dressed as Ardern.

Bracewell appeared on the panel show Patriot Brains in 2021.

In 2023, Melanie Bracewell & Ray O'Leary briefly hosted the podcast "Bananapod" before it went into hiatus.

Recognition 
In 2014, Bracewell won 7 Days Comedy Apprentice; the following year she won the Raw Comedy Quest and in 2016 won Best Auckland Newcomer at the New Zealand International Comedy Festival.

In 2018, Bracewell received the Billy T Award for the country's best emerging comedian. The same year she won Breakthrough Comedian of the Year at the NZ Comedy Guild Awards. In 2019, she was short-listed for the Kevin Smith Memorial Cup for Outstanding Artist Achievement, Best Female Comedian and Bizarre Moment of the Year at the New Zealand Comedy Guild Awards.

Acting
In 2020, Bracewell starred as Karen in The Eggplant, a New Zealand teen drama crime-comedy series released to TVNZ OnDemand and YouTube.

Controversy
In 2019, Bracewell shared a screenshot on her Twitter account of a sexually explicit message which she said had come unprompted from someone in the Reddit cricketing community. A Reddit user later found a post from Bracewell in a subreddit soliciting sexual messages. A moderator from the Reddit cricketing community then contacted Bracewell asking her for details of who sent her the private message. She subsequently apologised and admitted her post was a joke. After her apology she received criticism on social media, with some accusing her of lying about sexual harassment and stereotyping Indians.

References

External links 

 

Living people
New Zealand comedians
New Zealand women comedians
New Zealand stand-up comedians
People from North Shore, New Zealand
Melanie